Trochanteriidae is a family of spiders first described by Ferdinand Karsch in 1879 containing about 52 species in6 genera. Most are endemic to Australia though Doliomalus and Trochanteria are from South America and Plator is from Asia. Platyoides species exist in southern and eastern Africa, Madagascar, and the Canary Islands with one species, P. walteri, introduced to Australia.

Genera

, the World Spider Catalog accepts the following genera:

Doliomalus Simon, 1897 – Chile
Hemicloea Thorell, 1870 – Australia, New Zealand
Plator Simon, 1880 – Asia
Platyoides O. Pickard-Cambridge, 1891 – Africa
Trochanteria Karsch, 1878 – Argentina, Paraguay, Brazil
Vectius Simon, 1897 – Brazil, Paraguay, Argentina

See also
 List of Trochanteriidae species

References

External links

 Picture of a Platyoides sp. from South Africa

 
Araneomorphae families